The Lae War Cemetery, established in 1944, is located adjacent to the Botanical Gardens in the centre of the city of Lae, the capital of Morobe Province, in Papua New Guinea.  The cemetery is managed by the Commonwealth War Graves Commission.

In World War II, Japanese and Commonwealth soldiers fought to hold the strategic areas of Papua New Guinea, and the Morobe Province was the site of several heated campaigns in late 1942–1943; by 1944, the Japanese had been driven off the island.  The cemetery holds the remains of over 2,800 soldiers, many of whom died in the Salamaua–Lae campaign, but also those who died in Japanese detention on the Island. As the remains of missing soldiers are recovered, they are interred in the cemetery.

History
In the early months of 1942, Japan dominated the skies.  Lae and Salamaua were bombed on 21 January 1942 by 100 planes, and 3,000 land troops arrived on 7 March. There were also landings at Salamaua, followed on 21 July by further landings at Buna and Gona on the east coast, as the Japanese prepared to push through the Owen Stanley Mountains across the Papuan Peninsula to Port Moresby. Lae became one of the bases from which the Japanese launched their southward drive, until it was stopped at Ioribaiwa Ridge, a point within  from Port Moresby.

Cemetery
The cemetery was dedicated in 1944 by Lieutenant-General Sir Leslie Morshead, assisted by Chaplain C. M. Swan and Chaplain J. W. Drakeford. The Commonwealth Graves Commission assumed responsibility for it in 1947. The Lae Memorial commemorates 300 men of the Australian forces (including Merchant Navy, Royal Australian Air Force, and the Australian Army) who lost their lives and have no known grave. It contains a total of 2,800 burials, of which 444 are unidentified.

Design
Rising from the Cemetery forecourt, a wide flight of steps leads to a flat-topped colonnade.  The central span of the colonnade frames a view of the Cross of Sacrifice, found in every Commonwealth War Graves Commission cemetery of more than 40 burials.  The cross stands on an expansive lawn in which bronze plaques mark the grave sites.

War Memorial
The Lae Memorial to the Missing stands in the cemetery, to commemorate 328 officers and men of the Australian Army, the Australian Merchant Navy and the Royal Australian Air Force who died in Papua New Guinea and have no known grave.  The naval casualties were killed, or died of injuries received, on HMS King George V, HMS Glenearn and Empire Arquebus, and the four men of the Merchant Navy were killed when the SS Gorgon was bombed and damaged in Milne Bay in April 1943.

Burials
The cemetery contains two classifications of burials, the identified and the unidentified.  Most of the 2,818 burials are identified.  Graves also include 426 Indian soldiers who were taken prisoner by the Japanese in the Malaya and Hong Kong and interred in Papua New Guinea. (See the 7th Rajput Regiment and the 14th Punjab Regiment).  Most of the dead were killed in the Salamaua-Lae campaign in 1943, in particular, action at the Ramu Valley, Shaggy Ridge, and the Finisterre region. (See Australian 3rd Division.)

The cemetery also contains the grave of William Ellis Newton VC. Newton was awarded the Victoria Cross on 19 October 1943 for his actions on 16–18 March, becoming the only Australian airman to earn the decoration in the South West Pacific theatre of World War II, and the only one while flying with an RAAF squadron.

Lieutenant Albert Chowne (1920–1945) is buried there too. Chowne had served enlisted in the 2nd/13th Australian Infantry Battalion in Tobruk, Libya in 1941. Upon receiving his commission, he was with the 2nd/2nd Australian Infantry Battalion in New. Guinea when he was killed attacking an enemy foxhole. He received the Victoria Cross for his actions.

Commemorations
The annual dawn service is held every ANZAC (Australia New Zealand Army Corps) day to commemorate the dead.  The day is celebrated on 25 April, the landing of the Australian and New Zealand forces at Galipoli during World War I.  The typical service is patterned on the military dawn "stand-to," followed by an introduction, hymns, prayer, an address, the laying of wreaths, a recitation or two, followed by the playing of the Last Post. The service concludes with a minute of silence, Reveille, and the New Zealand and Australian national anthems.

Recent burials
On 13 January 1999, two men who had died on a 1944 jungle reconnaissance flight were buried at the Lae War Cemetery. A Wirraway aircraft flown by RAAF Flight Lieutenant Denis John Unkles crashed into the Papua New Guinea jungle on 15 April 1944, killing Unkles and his passenger, Army Lieutenant John Rawdon Fethersonhaugh. The flight had departed from the Gusap Strip on 15 April 1944, for an operational reconnaissance of the Wantoat area. Unkles' granddaughter played the last post.

In April 1999, RAAF Flying Officer Maurice Ambrose Bellert of the No. 82 Squadron RAAF, originally from Bundaberg, Queensland, was buried in Lae War Cemetery with full military honours. His P-40 Kittyhawk crashed into the sea off Irian Jaya on 18 October 1944, after a raid on Japanese positions. His name was removed from the memorial for the missing, and he received a headstone of his own.

Nearby war cemeteries
This cemetery contains 3,819 Commonwealth burials, 702 of them unidentified. It was started in 1942 by the Australian Army and is the only Papua New Guinea cemetery to contain white marble headstones and a Stone of Remembrance.

Names recorded in Memorial

Panel 1
.

Australian Imperial Force

Headquarters

Lieutenant Colonels

NX484 Fenton A.G. MBE

Majors

QX43794 Hopkinson R.E.D

Captains

NGX189 Evensen M.G

NX42188 Massie J.H.H

NX112723 Watson W.P

Lieutenants

NGX48 Barracluff J.T.

VX20171 Fetherstonhaugh J.R

QX26597 Graham P.O

Australian Light Horse

2/2 Cavalry Commando Squadron

Troopers

WX34934 Beadman R.L.

NX57432 Brown H.

NX51317 Cole H.J

VX117978 Mitchell P.R

2/5 Commando Squadron

Troopers
QX28187 Duffy G.P.

NX114117 Ireland F.J

2/6 Commando Squadron

Troopers

QX60160 Mathiesen R.L

2/9 Commando Squadron

Lance Sergeants

NX5515 Ochiltree E.G

Troopers

NX202873 Hanly A.G

2/10 Commando Squadron

Troopers

NX202130 Noonan J.D

Australian Armoured Corps

2/4 Armored Regiment

Troopers

WX16831 Skinner C.J

Royal Australian Artillery

2/3 Field Regiment

Gunners

NX53000 McDonald J.D.A

NX37718 Shaw A.S

NX18075 Switzer L.H Served as Dearden L.H

NX17833 Weatherston J.F

2/7 Field Regiment

Gunners
TX8234 Eiszele T.J

14 Field Regiment

Bombardiers

NX49992 O'Halloran W.J

2/1 Tank Attack Regiment

Sergeants

QX4666 Hanson R.J

Bombardiers

QX12516 Heuston V.V

Gunners

QX3146 Dark J.W

TX1227 Hadfield R.P

2/4 Light A.A Regiment

Majors

NX34795 S Beecraft V.E

172 Light A.A. Battery

Gunners

VX133932 Hyland M.J

Panel 2

Australian Imperial Force

Royal Australian Engineers

2/3 Field Company

Sappers

NX11154 Pearson W.W

2/14 Field Company

Sappers

NX165877 McGovern C.B

9 Workshops and Park Company

Sappers

NX128663 Matthews J.

5 Mechanical Equipment Company

Sappers

NX204635 MacDougall J. F

3 A.A. Fortress Company

Sappers

QX34329 Tormey R. J

16 Small Ships Company

Sappers

SX38108 Bushell R.M.F

Australian Corps of Signals

Signalmen

QX64904 McBarron L.J

Australian Infantry

"Z" Special Unit

Lieutenants

NX82924 Gubbay A.R.

Lance Corporals

NX202843 Walklate S.H.

Privates

NX92651 Eagleton R.E

"M" Special Unit

Captains

PX178 Pursehouse L.

Sergeants

NX143314  Siffleet L.G

2/3 Independent Company

Lance Corporals

NX44160 Cooper R.A

Privates

VX105900 Snadden J.W

2/4 Independent Company

Corporals

WX25155 Pitos J.P

Privates

WX25054 Hamersley A.J.T.P

2/5 Independent Company

Majors

NX65838 Kneen T.P

Privates

VX122008 Bonnell J.M.

VX108572 Pedder E.A

2/7 Independent Company

Captains

NX55542 Owen G.T

Lance Corporals

QX8505 Flynn P.D

Privates

QX8764 Dickson J.H

VX113027 Else R.C

NX115168 Graham E.C

QX31869 Johns J.N

SX20274 Linton R.C.H

SX15805 McKay R.H

VX120127 MacMahon A.J

SX16040 Medland H.E.J

2/3 Infantry Battalion

Privates

NX4584 Bateup L.A

TX14609 Chilcott D.L

NX122705 Davis R.

NX120151 Kendall K.B

NX4614 Shiel T.K

Panel 3

Australian Imperial Force

Australian Infantry

2/5 Infantry Battalion

Lieutenants

QX6681 Doneley A.R. M.C

Corporals

VX56539 Allen J.F

NX72456 Gay A.C

Privates

NX201879 Douglas T.G

VX33825 Feeley H.J

VX53333 Marks T.G.H

VX7533 Whitelock G.B.R

2/6 Infantry Battalion

Corporals

VX36060 Grant R.C

Privates

VX33800 Carracher W.A.J

NX161891 Hennessy C.B

2/7 Infantry Battalion

Privates

QX27523 Thomas V.L

2/8 Infantry Battalion

Privates

QX33063 Rains F.G

2/12 Infantry Battalion

Privates

NX108177 Bowden K.J

2/14 Infantry Battalion

Privates

QX30038 Hubner G.H

2/15 Infantry Battalion

Privates

QX15253 Owens M.J

2/16 Infantry Battalion

Privates

WX5591 Henderson W.J

NX126131 Tindall J.I

WX4726 Wallace L.C.L

2/17 Infantry Battalion

Lance Corporals

NX85704 O'Brien L

2/23 Infantry Battalion

Captains

VX46713 Reid R.K. M.C

NX169503 Gomm N.L

QX54584 McAlorum J

2/25 Infantry Battalion

Lieutenants

QX14258 Shaw J.T

Corporals

QX9328 Austin R.G

NX88924 Morel P.F

Privates

VX87082 McKenzie G.F

2/27 Infantry Battalion

Corporals

SX8157 Kemp D.C.W

Privates

SX27529 Smith M

2/28 Infantry Battalion

Sergeants

WX6697 MacGregor A.C

Lance Corporals

WX1092 Peacock S.W

Privates

WX11974 Ashby J.J

WX6027 Bell T.H

WX20198 Brown E.G

WX109541 Calder A.J

WX13684 Caporn B.LeR

VX18801 Carter H.R.W

WX17939 Chilvers J.D

WX19351 Forsyth A.L

WX20153 Fowler N.S

WX20056 Grimwood D

NX21625 Haim J

WX17874 Heath G.H

WX19845 Leonard J.E

WX19112 McMaster A

WX20042 Nankiville S.C

WX19857 Polinelli V.J

WX11520 Smith E.J

WX6783 Stephen L.T

Panel 4
.

Australian Imperial Force

Australian Infantry

2/31 Infantry Battalion

Privates

NX78164 Ford M.J

NX155390 Horwood M.R.S

QX69848 Jorgensen A.T

TX16004 Oakley L.T

NX203686 Ray I.T.L

NX92958 Smith D.W

2/33 Infantry Battalion

Lance Corporals

NX67141 Kelly P.L

Privates

NX6777 Ellis J.A

2/43 Infantry Battalion

Captains

SX8899 Buring O.G

24 Infantry Battalion

Lieutenants

VX104167 Young M.J

Lance Sergeants

VX104437 Fox W.P

Lance Corporals

VX104402 Betson A

Privates

VX143605 Arnold R.E

VX104448 Hellens W

30 Infantry Battalion

Corporals

SX23089 Phelan O.C. MM

31/51 Infantry Battalion

Lance Corporals

QX37339 Barbouttis A

58/59 Infantry Battalion

Corporals

VX56605 Beaumont A.G.W

2/3 Machine Gun Battalion

Sergeants
NX3947 Hall V.R

Corporals

NX86092 May F.R

Privates

NX79521 Gordon R.C

SX14341 White R.M

2/2/Pioneer Battalion

Lieutenants

NX69757 White R.B

2/4 Pioneer Battalion

Privates

SX25862 Coombe L.A

1 Papuan Infantry Battalion

Lieutenants

QX55175 Bruce T.A

New Guinea Volunteer Rifles

Lance Corporals

NGX460 Anderson F.T.B

Panel 5
.

Australian Imperial Force

Australian Army Service Corps

Sergeants

VX116524 Richards L.J

Corporals

NX156810 Latham S

NX31956 Welch G.J

Australian Army Medical Corps

Corporals

NX87378 Kelson G.

Australian Army Ordnance Corps

Privates

QX26044 McDowall I.S

Corps of Electrical and Mechanical

Engineers

Craftsmen
NX139655 Coste J

Australian Army Provost Corps

Corporals

SX9093 Feuerheerdt A.W

Australian Army Transportation Corps

Lieutenants

QX4655 Jones A.M

Australian Labour Service

Lance Sergeants

NX88349 Hyde A.J

Privates

VX47535 Lipp B

Australian Commonwealth Military Forces

Australian Infantry

24 Infantry Battalion

Privates

V260513 DeLacy R.R

35 Infantry Battalion

Privates

Q148482 Kraut J

New Guinea Volunteer Rifles

Lance Corporals

NG2003 Vernon R.E

Panel 6
.

Royal Australian Air Force

Wing Commanders

260411 Barker N.W

Squadron Leaders

402853 Dey P.A

224 Lewis M.V

574 McKenny C.R

255 Sage C.W.L

Flight Lieutenants

407161 Badger N.T., DFC

415620 Crisp E.E

563 Eddion E.D

409038 Fielfing I.H

415733 Horne C.AV

406784 Hughes J.T

270808 Jones E.A

545 McDonnell P.R

405321 O'Farrell R.H

418562 Park G.L

402133 Paxton R.R

411824 Plowman K.W

400736 Satchwell C.A

404683 Thomas R.J

408766 Unkles D.J

402097 White E.M

406121 White G.H

Flying Officers

403794 Amess J.W.B

260770 Anderson B.H

410192 Anderson S.L

431161 Bate A.V.E

419023 Beach R.E

404001 Bellert M.A

413520 Boyce R.F

429646 Buckland J.A

409289 Burnell N.G

408042 Carington-Smith E

431737 Chisholm C.L

427498 Clarke S.C

437399 Cornell J.R

439416 Dalglish A

406923 Davidson J.E

406124 Davies A.C.C

437476 Day R.V

412120 Donnan J.C

428699 Fletcher R.J

428386 Glendinning W

402595 Gurney D.A

426223 Hayes T.F

415159 Lucas G.A

416874 McLaren L.M

401984 Manger G.V

7246 Morrell A.K

10941 Munro H.C

422872 Negus E.R

401660 Oliver J.P

401145 Page A.R

403398 Shade C.R

421110 Stibbard N.R

400106 Summons H.D

418989 Thewlis N.McK

422895 Thompon J.G

402812 Wormald J.A

Pilot Officers

428901 Bernie W.B

35952 Bevan K.H

423606 Boyd A.S

403903 Byrnes K.G

412502 Fairfax R.L

410973 Glew W.C

423121 Howe E.M

416868 Lloyd S.L

412675 Passmore L.A.J

405647 Petrie A,M

426955 Richards J.D

401793 Smith G.T

408886 Starling J

418197 Stewart L

405427 Stirling J.McL

429418 Wallace D.J

413293 Warbrook C.S.J

437187 Williss C.J

406122 Wilson R.M

Warrant Officers

412376 Campbell A

404670 Giles A.E

414566 Hughes A.C

411069 Hunter A.J

420571 Keyes R.J

412081 Mogg G.C

405883 Schlengker P.G

416644 Tunbridge D.V

421950 Watson C

405949 Wilkinson E

421952 Willis M.W

Panel 7

Royal Australian Air Force

Flight Sergeants

427775 Boyd H.J

434615 Brown R.P.s

409504 Burrowes T

427446 Davies A.J

10424 Devitt L.M

409528 Fairbairn M

417834 Guster P.F

417366 Harnden W.H

434252 Hay R.N

56177 Hay T.N

437825 Hewett M.J

415983 Hobbs R.G

408151 Ikin C.A

416776 Jackson M.H

415663 Kenny J.E

416770 Lamb J.B

442351 Lambert R

418154 McDonald F.G

416771 McLean N.D

433732 Macgregor R.A

410995 Maloney F

431510 O'Brien B.M

401048 Patterson C.F

433741 Peatfield G.A

434897 Pratt W.H

418466 Richards J.J

22750 Richardson E.R

414841 Salter A.J

6188 Sawrey A.G

433966 Tonge C.N

27141 Wiles K.R

418033 Wise T.W

425801 Yates W.J

Sergeants

11321 Allott R.M

405710 Bailey L.M

60200 Barter R.T

47042 Blackmore F.L.H

435439 Brown L.E

13356 Burgess F.T

414541 Dawes L

405839 Desmond D.W

13055 Eastwood B.G

407360 Ellis M.C

408805 Friday A.I

405549 Gibson J.A

13362 Gluyas R.J

39426 Hamilton D

431282 Hattersley, S.J

401779 Kerr R.T

411504 Marsh T

11398 Maxted R.H.D

61752 Standing J.A

23771 Tyrrell M.B

442288 Way D.A

Corporals

11000 Burns A

34759 Maxwell W.J.C

26974 Penrose I.L

6461 Perrett J

36648 Sharland D.A.J

47773 Whittaker W.A

12217 Wyche J.R

Leading Aircraftmen

11085 Anthony F.H

16961 Bone C.V

140267 Burns K.J

32579 Clarke L.T

140811 Coleman I.S

425276 Cook G.W

73200 Costigan W.A

33871 Cox J.L

22050 Craigie J.E.B

23560 Grouch A.H

16809 Downes A

170241 Dunderdale W.R

25843 Edwards G.J

149300 Haddow D.E

71457 Harland E.J

72043 Lyons S.E

153077 Mann S.D

73231 Marshall B.A

9034 Meadow A.D

88726 Morgan V.A

69438 Street F

Aircraftmen Class 1

149289 Luck W.B

146748 Smith J.H.A

Royal Australian Air Force Nursing Service

Sisters

501399 Craig M.E

Panel 8

Papua New Guinea Infantry

1 Papuan Infantry Battalion

Lance Corporals

Atitona
Evoa

Kori

Privates

Bagawi

Ere

Frank

Gosi

Heore

Imche

Kilo

Naromai

Nupugi

Oganowa

Simora

1 New Guinea Infantry Battalion

Privates
Agi

2 New Guinea Infantry Battalion

Corporals

Estrom

Tangoli

Lance Corporals

Papriko

Privates

Eibil

Willi

3 New Guinea infantry Battalion

Privates

Katin-Gori

Lokanguru

Australian New Guinea Administrative

Unit

Corporals

Kokimara

Privates

Beka

Eriwell

Kokae

Mouki

Nabuoi

Nanko

Wanbumamini

Waworo

Pacific Island Regiment

Privates

Branimu

Karmun

Ombola

Tominit

New Guinea Police Force

Sergeants

Lus

Mas

Saplia

Constables

Baili

Darok

Juliam

Kalampsi

Keu

Kundi

Mo

Paliau

Peri

Sauman

Australian Imperial Force

Headquarters

Warrant Officers 2

Strudwick R.B

See also

 List of Australian military memorials

References

External links

 P. Applebee, Alphabetical list of internees Australian War Graves and PBG War Forum. 2001.
 
 

Australian military memorials
Commonwealth War Graves Commission cemeteries in Papua New Guinea
Lae
Australian diaspora